Hampstead Theatre is a theatre in South Hampstead in the London Borough of Camden. It specialises in commissioning and producing new writing, supporting and developing the work of new writers. Roxana Silbert has been the artistic director since 2019.

History 

The original theatre (The Hampstead Theatre Club) was created in 1959 in Moreland Hall, a parish church school hall in Holly Bush Vale, Hampstead Village. James Roose-Evans was the founder and first Artistic Director, and the 1959–1960 season included The Dumb Waiter and The Room by Harold Pinter, Eugène Ionesco's Jacques and The Sport of My Mad Mother by Ann Jellicoe. In 1962 the company moved to a portable cabin in Swiss Cottage where it remained for nearly 40 years, before, in 2003, the new purpose-built Hampstead Theatre opened in Swiss Cottage. The main auditorium seats 373 people. The studio theatre, Hampstead Downstairs, seats up to 100 people and was turned into a laboratory for new writing in 2010.

Artistic directors 
 James Roose-Evans (1959–1971)
 Vivian Matalon (1971–1973)
 Michael Rudman (1973–1978)
 David Aukin (1978–1984)
 Michael Attenborough (1984–1988)
 Jenny Topper (1988–2003)
 Anthony Clark (2003–2010)
 Edward Hall (2010–2019)
 Roxana Silbert (2019– )

Playwrights 
Playwrights who have had their early work produced at the theatre include:

 Mike Bartlett
 Simon Block
 Al Blyth
 Jeremy Brock
 Michael Frayn
 Brian Friel
 Rebecca Gilman
 Daniel Hill
 Terry Johnson
 Dennis Kelly
 Hanif Kureishi
 Mike Leigh
 Abi Morgan
 Tom Morton-Smith
 Rona Munro
 Harold Pinter
 Nina Raine
 Philip Ridley
 Saman Shad
 Martin Sherman
 Shelagh Stephenson
 Hugh Whitemore
 Crispin Whittell
 Roy Williams

References

External links 
 
 

Theatres in the London Borough of Camden
Producing house theatres in London
Buildings and structures in Hampstead
Swiss Cottage